Susan E. Lynch (born ) is an American pediatrician and the wife of John Lynch, the Democratic former governor of New Hampshire. Susan Lynch was the First Lady of New Hampshire from 2005 to 2013.

Since 2011, Lynch has been a pediatric lipid specialist at Dartmouth Hitchcock Clinic in Bedford, New Hampshire. She was a pediatric lipid specialist at the Cholesterol Treatment Center at Concord Hospital in Concord, New Hampshire from 2005 to 2011.

Early life and education
Lynch grew up in Saugus, Massachusetts, a Boston suburb. She graduated from Mount Holyoke College with a Bachelor's degree in Biologic Science in 1973, and the University of Massachusetts Medical School in Worcester, Massachusetts with a Doctor of Medicine in 1986. She started her pediatric internship at Tufts-New England Medical Center's Floating Hospital in Boston and finished her pediatric residency at Dartmouth-Hitchcock Medical Center in Hanover, New Hampshire. She practiced general pediatrics at the Dartmouth Hitchcock Clinic in Concord before going on to complete the lipid training programs at Johns Hopkins Medical Center and through the National Lipid Association.

First Lady of New Hampshire
Lynch was the First Lady of New Hampshire from 2005 to 2013. Lynch was a strong advocate of proper nutrition and physical exercise and the danger of childhood obesity.  She served as the spokesperson for the physical activity program "Walk NH," which is designed to challenge New Hampshire families to have fun getting in shape. She endorsed legislation that would have required New Hampshire public schools to record the body mass index of students in grades 1, 4, 7 and 10 unless the child's parents objected.

In November 2007, Lynch endorsed Hillary Clinton for President of the United States and became a national co-chairperson for the Clinton campaign.

Personal life
Lynch and her husband have three children, two daughters, Jacqueline and Julia, and a son, Hayden. Lynch lives in Hopkinton, New Hampshire.

References

Physicians from Massachusetts
Physicians from New Hampshire
Living people
Mount Holyoke College alumni
American women physicians
American pediatricians
Year of birth missing (living people)
University of Massachusetts Medical School alumni
First Ladies and Gentlemen of New Hampshire
People from Saugus, Massachusetts
People from Hopkinton, New Hampshire
Women pediatricians
21st-century American women